Coolidge is a city in Hamilton County, Kansas, United States.  As of the 2020 census, the population of the city was 80.

History
The city of Coolidge was named after Thomas Jefferson Coolidge, the former president of the Atchison, Topeka and Santa Fe Railway.

The first post office in Coolidge was established in July 1881.

Geography
Coolidge is located at  (38.042318, -102.010210).

Climate
According to the Köppen Climate Classification system, Coolidge has a semi-arid climate, abbreviated "BSk" on climate maps.

Demographics

2010 census
As of the census of 2010, there were 95 people, 43 households, and 26 families residing in the city. The racial makeup of the city was 82.1% White and 17.9% from other races. Hispanic or Latino of any race were 33.7% of the population.

There were 43 households, of which 30.2% had children under the age of 18 living with them, 41.9% were married couples living together, 9.3% had a female householder with no husband present, 9.3% had a male householder with no wife present, and 39.5% were non-families. 32.6% of all households were made up of individuals, and 18.6% had someone living alone who was 65 years of age or older. The average household size was 2.21 and the average family size was 2.88.

The median age in the city was 42.1 years. 25.3% of residents were under the age of 18; 2% were between the ages of 18 and 24; 27.4% were from 25 to 44; 28.4% were from 45 to 64; and 16.8% were 65 years of age or older. The gender makeup of the city was 50.5% male and 49.5% female.

2000 census
As of the census of 2000, there were 86 people, 36 households, and 25 families residing in the city. The racial makeup of the city was 70.93% White, 26.74% from other races, and 2.33% from two or more races. Hispanic or Latino of any race were 33.72% of the population.

There were 36 households, out of which 33.3% had children under the age of 18 living with them, 66.7% were married couples living together, 5.6% had a female householder with no husband present, and 27.8% were non-families. 27.8% of all households were made up of individuals, and 22.2% had someone living alone who was 65 years of age or older. The average household size was 2.39 and the average family size was 2.88.

In the city, the population was spread out, with 19.8% under the age of 18, 8.1% from 18 to 24, 24.4% from 25 to 44, 19.8% from 45 to 64, and 27.9% who were 65 years of age or older. The median age was 43 years. For every 100 females, there were 83.0 males. For every 100 females age 18 and over, there were 86.5 males.

The median income for a household in the city was $36,250, and the median income for a family was $36,250. Males had a median income of $22,000 versus $26,250 for females. The per capita income for the city was $17,485. There were no families and 3.0% of the population living below the poverty line, including no under eighteens and 6.3% of those over 64.

Cultural references
In the 1983 movie National Lampoon's Vacation starring Chevy Chase as Clark Griswold, the Griswolds visits Cousin Eddie and his family, who live on a farm outside Coolidge.

Gallery

See also
 Santa Fe Trail

References

Further reading

External links

 Coolidge - Directory of Public Officials
 USD 494, local school district
 Coolidge City Map, KDOT

Cities in Kansas
Cities in Hamilton County, Kansas